was a Japanese voice actor from Tokyo who was attached to Arts Vision at the time of his death. His family name and his first name are often misprinted as "Mizushima" (水島) and "Tetsuya" (鉄矢) by numerous journals. He was a lecturer in the Katsuta Voice Actor's Academy and starred in a number of Studio Pierrot series in the 1980s.

Voice roles

Television animation
Anime Sanjūshi (1987) (Inn Proprietor (episodes 16 and 17))

Unknown date
Ashita no Joe 2 (Tōno)
Blue Comet SPT Layzner (Chifurenko)
Captain Tsubasa (Misaki's Father)
Chikkun Takkun (Chikkun's Father)
Cooking Papa (Osamu Fukai (second voice))
Dragon Ball (Kurigashira-sensei, Dog)
Dragon Ball Z (Zorudo)
Dr. Slump: Arale-chan (Kurigashira-sensei, Dog, Doctor Usune)
Esper Mami (Chief)
Gundam series
Kidō Senshi Gundam (Captain Gadem (episode 3))
Kidō Senshi Gundam ZZ (Leader, Neo Shion Soldier)
Idol Densetsu Eriko (Kenzō Hirata)
Jungle Kurobē (Pao Pao)
Kinnikuman (Brocken Junior, Yosaku-san, Franky, Brockenman, Duke Kamata, Wild Bakuto)
Mashin Eiyuuden Wataru (Touch Down)
Mirai Shōnen Conan (Kuzō)
Nils no Fushigi na Tabi (Ondori, Swan King)
Nintama Rantarō (Tetsumaru Kinoshita, Kamisuki Sennin)
Osomatsu-kun (1988 version) (Tō-san, Beshi)
R.O.D the TV (Old Man)
Slayers Evolution-R (Hunter)
Soreike! Anpanman (Tekkotsu Hollerman Blue)

OVA
Ginga Eiyū Densetsu (xxxx) (Bronze)
Konpeki no Kantai (xxxx) (Naohiko Kumagai)
Osomatsu-kun: Iyami Hahitori Kaze no Naka (1990) (Tō-san, Beshi)
Osomatsu-kun: Suika no Hoshi Karakonnichiha-zanzu! ((1989) Tō-san, Beshi)
Ozanari Dungeon: Kaze no Tō (xxxx) (Foron)
Warau Hyōteki (xxxx) (Villager)

Theatrical animation
Kaibutsu-kun: Kaibutsu Land he no Shōtai (xxxx) (Gorilla King)
Kaze no Tani no Nausicaä (xxxx) (Command)
Kidō Senshi Gundam (xxxx) (Gadem, Amuro Confederation Soldier, Old Refugee)
Kinnikuman series (xxxx-xx) (Brocken Junior, Yosaku-san)
Ninja Hattori-kun + Paaman: Chōnōryoku Wars (xxxx) (Person)
Xabungle Graffiti (xxxx) (Giro Bull)

Video games
Shinobi (2002) (Hakuraku)
Namco × Capcom (2005) (Hideo Shimazu, Grandmaster Meio)

unknown date
Gundam series
Kidō Senshi Gundam: Giren no Yabō series (Gadem)
Kidō Senshi Gundam: Meguriai Uchū (Gadem)
Kidō Senshi Gundam: Perfect One-Year War (Gadem, Masshu, Baromu)
Kidō Senshi Gundam Senki: Lost War Chronicles (Gadem)
SD Gundam: G Generation-F (Gadem)
Mirai Shōnen Conan (PC Engine version) (Garu)
Justice Gakuen series
Moero! Justice Gakuen (Hideo Shimazu)
Shiritsu Justice Gakuen: Legion of Heroes (Hideo Shimazu, Tiffany's Papa, Kimura)
Shiritsu Justice Gakuen: Nekketsu Seishun Nikki 2 (Hideo Shimazu)
Summon Night (Weasel)

Dubbing
A Bridge Too Far (Nippon TV edition) (Soldier)
The Dirty Dozen (Major General Worden)
Major League (Nippon TV edition) (Charlie Donovan)
The Smurfs (Papa Smurf)
Thunderbirds
Ultra 6 Roku Kyōdai vs. Kaijū Gundan (Butsuzō Thief Leader)

Tokusatsu
Kyōryū Sentai Koseidon (Sōkan Zaji (voice))
Mirai Sentai Timeranger (Gambler Velito (voice))
Robot Keiji (Long armed man (voice), Insight power man (voice))
Ultraman 80 (Space Ninja Alien Baltan (Godaime) (voice))

Other
Kidō Senshi Gundam 0079 Card Builder (Gadem)
Pachisuro Kinnikuman (Brocken Junior, Yosaku-san)

References

External links
 

1938 births
2010 deaths
Arts Vision voice actors
Japanese male video game actors
Japanese male voice actors
Male voice actors from Tokyo
20th-century Japanese male actors
21st-century Japanese male actors